Skryje is a municipality and village in Rakovník District in the Central Bohemian Region of the Czech Republic. It has about 100 inhabitants. The historic centre of the village is well preserved and is protected by law as a village monument zone.

Geography

The northern part of the municipal territory lies in the Plasy Uplands, the southern part lies in the Křivoklát Highlands. Skryje is located in the Křivoklátsko Protected Landscape Area.

History
The first written mention of Skryje is from 1239, when it was owned by the Kladruby Abbey. From 1375 to 1601, the village was owned by various lower nobility. From 1601 until the abolition of manorialism, Skryje was part of the Křivoklát estate.

Sights
Skryje is known for paleontological and geological research. The first mention of the collection of local fossils comes from 1832. The village became famous when French geologist Joachim Barrande discovered rich fossil deposits of trilobites in the close surroundings of the village, when he was surveying the terrain for a horse-pulled railroad.

Today there is the Monument to Joachim Barrand, which is a small museum with paleontological and geological exposition. Part of the museum is dedicated to a country life at the turn of 19th and 20th century in Skryje and its surroundings.

There is also an educational trail dedicated to fossil sites and creatures whose fossils have been found here. It is still possible to find fossils in several places.

The Church of Saint Michael the Archangel was first mentioned in 1350, already as a parish church. The current baroque building dates from 1713.

References

External links

Villages in Rakovník District